Mõniste Parish was a rural municipality in Võru County, southeastern Estonia.

In 2017, it merged with Rõuge Parish, Haanja Parish, Misso Parish, and Varstu Parish to create a new entity. It retained the Rõuge Parish name.

Settlements
Villages
Hürova - Hüti - Kallaste - Karisöödi - Koemetsa - Kuutsi - Mõniste - Parmupalu - Peebu - Sakurgi - Saru - Singa - Tiitsa - Tundu - Tursa - Vastse-Roosa - Villike

Visitor attractions
Mõniste Peasant Museum is located in Kuutsi village.

Twin towns 
 Kaavi, Finland

References

External links
 
Mõniste Peasant Museum 

Former municipalities of Estonia